In the 2017–18 season, CR Belouizdad competed in Ligue 1 for the 52nd season, as well as the Algerian Cup.

Competitions

Overview

{| class="wikitable" style="text-align: center"
|-
!rowspan=2|Competition
!colspan=8|Record
!rowspan=2|Started round
!rowspan=2|Final position / round
!rowspan=2|First match	
!rowspan=2|Last match
|-
!
!
!
!
!
!
!
!
|-
| Ligue 1

|  
| 12th
| 26 August 2017 
| 19 May 2018
|-
| Algerian Cup

| Round of 64 
| Round of 16
| 30 December 2017
| 1 February 2018
|-
| Super Cup

| Final 
| style="background:silver;"| Runners–up
| colspan=2| 1 November 2017
|-
| Confederation Cup

| First round 
| Play-off round
| 9 February 2018
| 17 April 2018
|-
! Total

Ligue 1

League table

Results summary

Results by round

Matches

Algerian Cup

Algerian Super Cup

The 2017 Algerian Super Cup is the 11th edition of the Algerian Super Cup, a competition with only one match, organized by the Professional Football League (LFP) and the Algerian Football Federation (FAF) since 2013. The Algerian Ligue Professionnelle 1 champion competes against the winner of the Algerian Cup.

Therefore, ES Sétif, the 2016-2017 champion of Algeria, played against CR Belouizdad, winner of the 2016–17 Algerian Cup. The rules of the game are: the duration of the game is 90 minutes and in case of a tie, a session of penalties is performed to separate the teams. Three substitutions are allowed for each team.

Confederation Cup

Preliminary round

First round

Play-off round

Squad information

Playing statistics

|-
! colspan=16 style=background:#dcdcdc; text-align:center| Goalkeepers

|-
! colspan=16 style=background:#dcdcdc; text-align:center| Defenders

|-
! colspan=16 style=background:#dcdcdc; text-align:center| Midfielders

|-
! colspan=16 style=background:#dcdcdc; text-align:center| Forwards

|-
! colspan=16 style=background:#dcdcdc; text-align:center| Players transferred out during the season

Goalscorers
Includes all competitive matches. The list is sorted alphabetically by surname when total goals are equal.

Squad list

As of August 25, 2017.

Transfers

In

Out

References

2017-18
CR Belouizdad